Axel Wieandt (born 19 September 1966) is a German manager. He has been serving as a honorary professor at WHU – Otto Beisheim School of Management since 2004.

Early life and education 

Axel Wieandt is the son of Paul Wieandt, former CEO of several German banks. Axel Wieandt is married and father of two children.

In 1986 he started his academic studies at the WHU – Otto Beisheim School of Management (WHU), where he graduated with a degree in Business Administration (“Diplom Kaufmann”). Between 1988 and 1990 he was a scholar of the Studienstiftung des Deutschen Volkes. In 1992, he earned an MBA degree at the Kellogg School of Management, Northwestern University (Illinois), supported by a DAAD scholarship. In 1993 he earned a doctorate degree in Business Administration (“Dr. rer. pol.”) at the WHU with Professor Horst Albach as his thesis advisor.

Career 

Wieandt started his career in 1993 with McKinsey & Company in Düsseldorf and Boston. Between 1997 and 1998 he worked for Morgan Stanley in London in the Mergers & Acquisitions and Restructuring Department.

Deutsche Bank 

In 1998, he left Morgan Stanley to join Deutsche Bank. In 2000 Wieandt became the youngest divisional head in Deutsche Bank's Corporate Center. As Head of Corporate Development, Wieandt and his team were in charge of developing Deutsche Bank's Group strategy as well as executing strategic transactions. From 2003 on, he was also appointed Global Head of Corporate Investments, with P&L responsibility for the bank's entire investment portfolio with a total volume of several billion EUR.

Hypo Real Estate 

In October 2008, former German Federal Minister of Finance Peer Steinbrück announced that the Hypo Real Estate's entire board of directors would be replaced. At the time, the bank was experiencing severe financial difficulties as a result of the financial crisis. A consortium of German financial service providers proposed that Axel Wieandt should serve as HRE's chief executive officer. Thereafter, Wieandt was appointed chief executive officer and chairman of the management board of HRE. On March 25, 2010, he offered his resignation as chief executive officer to the supervisory board of HRE. The supervisory board accepted and released him from his duties. According to a HRE press release, the reasons cited for this were differences in opinion regarding the management of the bank between the CEO and the Financial Market Stabilisation Fund (SoFFin, the governmental entity that owns HRE). German news magazine Der Spiegel confirmed that differences in opinion regarding the bank's management prevailed. According to Der Spiegel journalist Christoph Pauly, Wieandt deemed these differences in opinion an "imposition". According to insiders, Wieandt demanded more entrepreneurial freedom from the government, the sole owner of HRE. Whereas according to Wieandt, the bank's core capital ratio should be kept above ten per cent, the SoFFin's chief executive Hannes Rehm had promised a “gentle handling” of taxpayers’ money and urged for a lower figure. According to German business magazine Manager Magazin, the HRE's supervisory board deemed that, "Wieandt contributed significantly to the bank's stabilisation and realignment". Journalists Eigendorf and Jost write in German daily newspaper Die Welt that "Wieandt did a good job at HRE". They argue that Wieandt was frustrated about an "unnecessarily time-consuming decision-making process", and a "lack of leeway" in paying HRE staff.

Return to Deutsche Bank 

On 1 June 2010, Wieandt returned to Deutsche Bank, where he was a Managing Director in the Corporate Center responsible for Integration Management. Eigendorf and Jost write that, in 2010 a BaFin associate unexpectedly objected Axel Wieandt's appointment as the chief executive officer of the BHF Bank. Therefore, Deutsche Bank refrained from officially proposing Axel Wieandt as the BHF Bank's chief executive officer. Eigendorf and Jost argue that the objection was a "retort". BaFin president Jochen Sanio confirmed in a press interview that he had a personal conversion with Wieandt in Bonn, and that there were "no banking supervisory legal reasons for not appoiting Wieandt chief executive officer".

Credit Suisse 

On 1 July 2011, Wieandt was appointed managing director of Credit Suisse Deutschland's Investment Banking Department. There, he served as an account executive responsible for financial service provider clients from countries such as Germany, Austria, Sweden, and Norway. In June of 2012, Wieandt resigned from his position at Credit Suisse.

Valovis Bank 
On 26 October 2012, Axel Wieandt was appointed chief executive officer and chairman of the management board of the Valovis Bank. The former Karstadt-Quelle-Bank is a specialist for credit cards, real estate financing and factoring in the German market. On the back of write-downs on Greek government bonds in December 2011 the bank had to be rescued by the Association of German Banks (Bundesverband deutscher Banken, BdB). According to the German daily newspaper FAZ Wieandt took over a “difficult restructuring case”. In the Valovis press release he said that “we will critically examine the business model and take the necessary measures to stabilize the bank”.

Former consulting activities and board memberships 

From December 2003 until June 2010, Wieandt served as a supervisory board member of Dutch credit insurer Atradius. From February 2011 until April 2017, Wieandt was a counsellor at Aquila Capital.

In April 2017 it was announced that Wieandt would work as a consultant for Corestate Capital. Wieandt was the head of post merger integration at Corestate and repositioned the stock portfolio; the company eventually managed to purchase German leasing firm Hannover Leasing Group. Wieandt served as Hannover Leasing Group's chairman of the supervisory board from July 2017 until January 2022.

Current consulting activities and board memberships 

In July 2016, Wieandt was appointed advisory board member at fintech company Debitos. German Private-Banking-Magazin editor Christian Nicolaisen believes that Wieandt supports Debitos with expanding further into Europe. Since October 2018, Wieandt has been a consultant at Exporo AG, and since September 2020, he has been a HPE Growth consultant.

In early 2021, German fintech Auxmoney announced that Wieandt joined the newly founded „Strategic Advisory Council“ committee. Wieandt has been a long-term independent board member of Auxmoney since 2012.

Teaching assignments 

From 2002 until 2004, Wieandt was a lecturer at WHU – Otto Beisheim School of Management. Since 2004, he has been a honorary professor for financial intermediation at WHU, where he has been teaching business administration and bank management. In addition to that, Wieandt has been a bank management lecturer at Goethe Business School in Frankfurt am Main. In early 2016, Wieandt taught the "European Banking and the Financial Crisis" seminar at the Kellogg School of Management in Evanston/Illinois.

Miscellaneous 

He has been a member of the Board of Trustees of the European Trust for the Cathedral of Speyer since 2009.

Since 2009, Wieandt holds the position of EMEA Chairman of the Kellogg Alumni Council.

Works 

 Books

 Gedichte (1986) deutscher lyrik verlag, Aachen 2013, ISBN 978-3-8422-4185-5
 Unfinished Business: Putting European Banks (and Europe) Back on Track, Vandenhoeck & Ruprecht, Göttingen 2017, ISBN 978-3847107156

 Articles

 Contestable markets - ein Leitbild für die Wettbewerbspolitik? (with Harald Wiese), in: ORDO, Vol. 44, 1993, pp. 185 – 202.
 Versunkene Kosten und strategische Unternehmensführung, in: ZfB, Vol. 64, 1994, H.8, pp. 99 – 116.
 Innovation and the Creation, Development and Destruction of Markets in the World machine Tool Industry, in: Small Business Econcomics, Vol. 6, 1994, pp. 421 – 437.
 Biotechnology: The emerging battlefield for US and Japanese pharmaceutical companies (with Naseem Amin), in: Technology Analysis & Strategic Management, Vol. 6, No. 4, 1994, pp. 423 – 435.
 Die Entwicklung von Märkten durch Innovationen, in: ZfbF, No. 10, October 1994, pp. 852 – 870.
 Deutsche Bank: Auf profitables Wachstum eingestellt (with Michael Bachschuster), in: Sebastian Raisch, Gilbert Probst, Peter Gomez (ed.): Wege zum Wachstum - Wie Sie nachhaltigen Unternehmenserfolg erzielen, April 2007, pp. 218 – 233.
 Neuausrichtung der Deutschland AG (with Dr. Anna Magdalena Haslinger), in: Martin Glaum, Ulrich Hommel, Dieter Thomaschewski (ed.): Internationalisierung und Unternehmenserfolg, November 2007, pp. 339 – 359.
 Herausforderung Klimawandel - Die Finanzmarktperspektive (with Thorsten Peppler), in: Die Bank, September 2008, pp. 12 – 17.
 Deutsche Pfandbriefbank als Immobilien- und Staatsfinanzierer, in: Immobilien & Finanzierung, October 2009, pp. 658 – 660.
 Too Big to Fail? - Leçons de la crise financière (with Sebastian Mönninghoff), in: Revue d'économie financière, 2011.

 The Financial Crisis: Observations and Implications – The HRE Case Study (coauthored by Sebastian C. Mönninghoff), in: Schmalenbachs Zeitschrift für betriebswirtschaftliche Forschung, vol. 63, August 2011, p. 508–530.
 Finanzsysteme benötigt effektive Bail-in-Regulierung, in: Börsenzeitung, 4 July 2013.
 The Future of Peer-to-Peer Finance, Zeitschrift für betriebswirtschaftliche Forschung, vol. 65, 2013, p. 455-487
 Rettung verboten, Handelsblatt Nr. 228, 26 November 2013, p. 23
 Staatliche Bankenrettung muss verboten werden, Börsen-Zeitung No. 139, 24 July 2014, p. 3
 Strategische Herausforderungen für Europas Banken, Die Bank, 3/2015, p. 28-32
 Non-Performing Loans – eine zentrale Herausforderung für die europäischen Banken, Zeitschrift für das gesamte Kreditwesen, vol. 70 2017, p. 36-39
 Die Währungsunion ist noch nicht vollständig, Börsenzeitung No. 174, 11 September 2018, p. 2
 Ein digitaler Euro für eine digitale Welt, Börsenzeitung No. 61, 27 March 2020, p. 8
 Krypotwährungen und die Folgen für europäische Banken, Frankfurter Allgemeine Zeitung No. 283, 4 December 2020, p. 29
 Können dezentrale Blockchain-Protokolle Banken ersetzen?, Frankfurter Allgemeine Zeitung No. 137, 17 June 2021, p. 27

References 

1966 births
German bankers
Living people